SS Polar Chief was a merchant steamship that was built in England in 1897 and scrapped in Scotland in 1952. In her 55-year career she had previously been called Montcalm, RFA Crenella, Crenella, Rey Alfonso, Anglo-Norse and Empire Chief. Early in the First World War she spent eight months pretending to be the battleship .

The ship was built in Newcastle upon Tyne as the cargo liner Montcalm. In the First World War she was a troop ship, a dummy battleship and a depot ship, and then in 1916 was converted into the oil tanker Crenella. She spent about 20 months in the Royal Fleet Auxiliary, survived being hit by a torpedo in 1917, and returned to civilian service in 1919.

In 1923 she was sold to Norwegian buyers who renamed her Rey Alfonso and had her converted to carry whale oil. In 1927 she was sold back to UK owners who renamed her Anglo-Norse and had her equipped as a whaling factory ship. In 1929 new owners bought her and renamed her Polar Chief. She was laid up in Norway in September 1939, but returned to Britain that December.

In the Second World War the ship carried heavy fuel oil and other cargoes as well as whale products. In 1941 the Ministry of War Transport acquired her and renamed her Empire Chief. In 1942 she ran aground, but was refloated and repaired. In 1946 she was returned to commercial ownership and her name was returned to Polar Chief. In 1952 she was scrapped by two shipbreakers in the west of Scotland.

Building
Montcalm was the first of a set of four sister ships built for the African Steamship Company. Palmers Shipbuilding and Iron Company in Jarrow built her, launching her on 17 May 1897 and completing her that August. Sir Raylton Dixon and Company in Middlesbrough built her sister ship , launching her on 17 June 1897 and completing her that September.

The dimensions of the two ships were almost identical. She was primarily a cargo ship, but she had berths for 12 Second Class passengers.

In 1897 Elder, Dempster registered Montcalm in Liverpool. Her UK official number was 106869 and her code letters were PTDS.

Elder, Dempster & Co ordered a second pair of ships from Palmers, built to the same design. Monteagle was launched on 13 December 1898 and completed in March 1899. Montfort was launched on 13 February 1899 and completed that April.

Career

Montcalm in peacetime
At the start of her career, Montcalm was managed by the African Steamship Company's parent company Elder, Dempster & Co. On 3 September 1897 she started her maiden voyage from Avonmouth to Montreal. On 13 November 1898 she was chartered to the Atlantic Transport Line. Between then and January 1900 Montcalm made eleven trans-Atlantic voyages between New York and either London or Gravesend.

On 5 April 1900 she sailed from Liverpool for Cape Town as a transport ship for the Second Boer War. Montcalm then made six return voyages between Cape Town and New Orleans, carrying horses or mules. In September 1900 The Daily Telegraph reported that she sustained a mutiny. Her English stokers had refused to work with several Danes who had been signed on to the ship, and US muleteers caring for her cargo of 1,400 mules objected to the quality of food aboard.

In June 1902 Montcalm started the first of four round trips between Avonmouth and Montreal. On 10 December that year she left Avonmouth for Saint John, New Brunswick. In 1903 she passed to Elder Dempster Lines when that company absorbed the African Steamship Company.

On 6 April 1903 the Canadian Pacific Railway bought Elder, Dempster's shipping service to and from Canada, with 14 ships including Montcalm and her three sisters. On 21 May 1903 she sailed from Swansea. Her usual route with Canadian Pacific was between Avonmouth and Montreal or Saint John, New Brunswick. She occasionally visited Bristol, Liverpool or Quebec, and on 11 March 1913 she called at Greenock.

By 1911 Montcalm was equipped for wireless telegraphy and submarine signalling. The Marconi Company supplied and operated her wireless equipment under contract. By 1913 her wireless call sign was MLZ.

Montcalm in the First World War
In August 1914 the Admiralty requisitioned Montcalm. She was initially used as a troop ship carrying members of the British Expeditionary Force. In October 1914 she was converted to a dummy battleship, mimicking , whose name she carried. She was a member of a dummy battleship squadron, which was disbanded on 6 July 1915.

In 1915 the Admiralty intended intended to use her as a blockship, but instead she was used as either a depot ship or a store ship. On 19 January 1916 she was transferred to the Shipping Controller, who appointed Frederick Leyland Ltd of Liverpool to manage her.

RFA Crenella
On 29 January the Admiralty bought Montcalm. In August 1916 she arrived in Liverpool for conversion into an oil tanker, which was completed on 26 October 1916.

In 1916 the ship was renamed Crenella, registered in London, and her code letters were changed to JNLQ. The Admiralty placed her under the management of either Lane and MacAndrews or the Anglo-Saxon Petroleum Company. Anglo Saxon Petroleum was a subsidiary of Royal Dutch Shell, which named all of its ships after genera of molluscs. Crenella is a genus of mussels. On 18 November 1916 the ship entered service with the Royal Fleet Auxiliary as RFA Crenella. On 11 October 1917 her ownership was transferred to the Shipping Controller.

Crenella was damaged but remained afloat. The US Navy destroyer  gave damage control assistance and escorted Crenella back to Queenstown. On 1 August 1918 a submarine fired a torpedo at Montcalm, but missed.

On 26 November 1919 Anglo Saxon Petroleum bought Crenella. On 19 October 1920 the Velefa Shipping Co Ltd of London bought her and placed under the management of Runciman & Co Ltd, but she was then laid up.

Rey Alfonso
On 20 June 1923 A/S Larvik Hvalfaugerselsk bought Crenella for £24,000, renamed her Rey Alfonso and registered her in Larvik in Norway. Her code letters were changed to LDJN. She was refitted as a whale oil depot ship and placed under the management of Christian Nielsen & Co. In 1925 HM Wrangell & Co A/S bought her and registered her in Haugesund.

Anglo-Norse
In 1927 the Anglo-Norse Company bought Rey Alfonso, renamed her Anglo-Norse and registered her in Tønsberg. She was fitted out with four 50-ton derricks to lift whales aboard for flensing. Hans Borge was appointed to manage her. He sent her to work in the South Sandwich Islands in the South Atlantic.

Polar Chief (1929)
In August 1929 the Falkland Whaling Company bought Anglo-Norse, renamed her Polar Chief and registered her in Jersey. By 1930 her wireless call sign was GFMT. She was laid up for the 1930 whaling season but then returned to service. By 1931 her navigation equipment included wireless direction finding.

In September 1939 Polar Chief was laid up at Tønsberg, but that December she left Norway in Convoy HN 5 to the Clyde. In the early part of the Second World War she continued whaling, visiting South Georgia in March 1940. In an attempt to reduce exposure to U-boats and German surface raiders, she sailed via the Western Atlantic. On her outward voyage she called at Curaçao. On her return voyage she called at Aruba, and then Halifax, Nova Scotia, where she joined Convoy HX 35 to reach The Downs off the coast of Kent. Her cargo on her return voyage was furnace fuel oil.

On 2 July 1941 the Ministry of War Transport acquired Polar Chief and appointed Christian Salvesen & Co Ltd to manage her. She sailed independently to New York, and returned via Halifax where she joined Convoy HX 141 to Belfast Lough. In October 1941 she sailed to New York again, returning via Halifax to join Convoy HX 156.

Empire Chief
On 17 November 1941 Polar Chief was renamed Empire Chief. On 16 January 1942 she ran aground at Reykjavík, Iceland. She was refloated on 7 March and temporarily repaired. She was towed back to Britain, leaving Reykjavík in 8 July and reaching the River Tyne on 15 July where she was permanently repaired.

In March 1943 Empire Chief left New York carrying fuel oil. She sailed with Convoy HX 231 to Belfast Lough. The Admiralty considered having her converted into a fleet oiler, but in April 1943 decided she was not stable enough at sea for this.

In August 1943 Empire Chief sailed with Convoy HX 251 from New York to Belfast Lough. Her cargo was fuel oil, plus a deck cargo of armoured fighting vehicles. In November 1943 she sailed with Convoy HX 266 from New York to the Clyde. Her cargo was fuel oil, plus spare depth charges.

From January until September 1944 Empire Chief operated in the Caribbean and along the East Coast of the United States. She called frequently at Guantanamo Bay and at New York, and occasionally at Aruba, Curaçao, Houston, Charleston and Portland, Maine.

In May 1945 Empire Chief sailed with Convoy HX 354 from New York to Liverpool. Her cargo was fuel oil and acids. In October 1945 she sailed unescorted from Curaçao to Swansea and then Barry.

Polar Chief (1946)
On 3 August 1946 the South Georgia Company bought Empire Chief, restored her name to Polar Chief, and registered her in Leith. Christian Salvesen remained her managers. In August 1947 she berthed in Avonmouth carrying whale bone meal, whale oil, sperm oil and salted whale livers from South Georgia, but also furnace fuel oil from Aruba. By 1948 her navigation equipment included an echo sounding device and radar.

On 29 April 1952 Polar Chief arrived at Dalmuir in Dunbartonshire for WH Arnott Young Ltd to start breaking her up. On 22 June her partly-dismantled hulk was towed to Troon in Ayrshire, where the West of Scotland Shipbreaking Co Ltd continued her demolition. Her hulk was beached on 27 August 1952, and demolition was completed on 12 January 1953.

Notes

References

Bibliography

External links

1897 ships
Cargo liners
Empire ships
Maritime incidents in 1917
Maritime incidents in January 1942
Merchant ships of Jersey
Merchant ships of Norway
Merchant ships of the United Kingdom
Ministry of War Transport ships
Second Boer War
Ships built on the River Tyne
Steamships of Jersey
Steamships of Norway
Steamships of the United Kingdom
Tankers of the Royal Fleet Auxiliary
World War I merchant ships of the United Kingdom
World War II tankers
World War II merchant ships of Jersey